The Israeli Basketball Premier League Quintet, or Israeli Basketball Super League Quintet, is an award given to the 5 best players of each season of the Israeli Basketball Premier League, which is the top-tier level men's professional basketball league in Israel.

Quintets

1989–90
 Adi Gordon (Hapoel Jerusalem)
 Brad Leaf (Hapoel Galil Elyon)
 Milt Wagner (Maccabi Ramat Gan)
 Richard Rellford (Maccabi Rishon LeZion)
 Earl Williams (Maccabi Ramat Gan)

1990–91
 Miki Berkovich (Maccabi Rishon LeZion)
 Doron Shefa (Hapoel Jerusalem)
 David Henderson (Hapoel Tel Aviv)
 Gene Banks (Maccabi Rishon LeZion)
 LaVon Mercer (Maccabi Tel Aviv)

1991–92
 Israel Elimelech (Hapoel Holon)
 Brad Leaf (2×) (Hapoel Galil Elyon)
 David Thirdkill (Hapoel Tel Aviv)
 Joe Dawson (Hapoel Eilat)
 Mike Mitchell (Maccabi Tel Aviv)

1992–93
 Doron Sheffer (Hapoel Galil Elyon)
 Radenko Dobraš (Hapoel Tel Aviv)
 David Thirdkill (2×) (Hapoel Tel Aviv)
 Joe Dawson (2×) (Hapoel Eilat)
 Eddie Phillips (Hapoel Givatayim)

1993–94
 Milt Wagner (2×) (Beitar Ramat Gan)
 Norris Coleman (Hapoel Jerusalem)
 David Thirdkill (3×) (Hapoel Tel Aviv)
 Wendell Alexis (Maccabi Tel Aviv)
 Eddie Phillips (2×) (Beitar Ramat Gan)

1994–95
 Darren Daye (Hapoel Galil Elyon)
 Derrick Gervin (Hapoel Gvat Yagur)
 J. J. Eubanks (Maccabi Ramat Gan)
 Buck Johnson (Hapoel Tel Aviv)
 Billy Thompson (Hapoel Jerusalem)

1995–96
 Nenad Marković (Hapoel Tel Aviv)
 Brian Oliver (Maccabi Rishon LeZion)
 Melvin Newbern (Hapoel Safed)
 Gur Shelef (Hapoel Galil Elyon)
 Andrew Kennedy (Hapoel Galil Elyon)

1996–97
 Adi Gordon (2×) (Hapoel Jerusalem)
 Corey Gaines (Hapoel Eilat)
 Mark Brisker (Maccabi Ra'anana)
 Tomer Steinhauer (Maccabi Ra'anana)
 Dametri Hill (Hapoel Tel Aviv)

1997–98
 Oded Kattash (Maccabi Tel Aviv)
 Doron Sheffer (2×) (Maccabi Tel Aviv)
 Mark Brisker (2×) (Maccabi Ra'anana)
 Tomer Steinhauer (2×) (Maccabi Ra'anana)
 Ed Elisma (Hapoel Eilat)

1998–99
 Oded Kattash (2×) (Maccabi Tel Aviv)
 Greg Sutton (Hapoel Holon)
 Kenny Williams (Hapoel Jerusalem)
 Radisav Ćurčić (Hapoel Jerusalem)
 Victor Alexander (Maccabi Tel Aviv)

1999–00
 Ariel McDonald (Maccabi Tel Aviv)
 Yoav Saffar (Hapoel Galil Elyon)
 Kenny Williams (2×) (Hapoel Jerusalem)
 Amir Muchtari (Hapoel Haifa)
 Nate Huffman (Maccabi Tel Aviv)

2000–01
 Ariel McDonald (2×) (Maccabi Tel Aviv)
 Rimantas Kaukėnas (Hapoel Galil Elyon)
 Yoav Saffar (Hapoel Galil Elyon)
 Tony Dorsey (Hapoel Jerusalem)
 Nate Huffman (2×) (Maccabi Tel Aviv)

2001–02
 Meir Tapiro (Hapoel Jerusalem)
 Danny Lewis (Ironi Ramat Gan)
 Anthony Parker (Maccabi Tel Aviv)
 Charles Minlend (Maccabi Givat Shmuel)
 Siniša Kelečević (Hapoel Jerusalem)

2002–03
 Lucius Davis (Maccabi Rishon Lezion)
 Jarod Stevenson (Bnei Hasharon)
 Charles Minlend (2×) (Maccabi Givat Shmuel)
 Ido Kozikaro (Hapoel Galil Elyon)
 Nikola Vujčić (Maccabi Tel Aviv)

2003–04
 Šarūnas Jasikevičius (Maccabi Tel Aviv)
 Meir Tapiro (2×) (Bnei Hasharon)
 Anthony Parker (2×) (Maccabi Tel Aviv)
 Eric Campbell (Ironi Nahariya)
 Nikola Vujčić (2×) (Maccabi Tel Aviv)

2004–05
 Šarūnas Jasikevičius (2×) (Maccabi Tel Aviv)
 Cory Carr (Ironi Ashkelon)
 Anthony Parker (3×) (Maccabi Tel Aviv)
 Lior Eliyahu (Hapoel Galil Elyon)
 Kelvin Gibbs (Hapoel Tel Aviv)

2005–06
 Timmy Bowers (Maccabi Givat Shmuel)
 Or Eitan (Maccabi Rishon LeZion)
 Omar Sneed (Maccabi Rishon LeZion)
 Lior Eliyahu (2×) (Hapoel Galil Elyon)
 Mario Austin (Hapoel Jerusalem)

2006–07
 Raviv Limonad (Ironi Nahariya)
 Tre Simmons (Hapoel Galil Elyon)
 Lee Nailon (Bnei Hasharon)
 Mario Austin (2×) (Hapoel Jerusalem)
 Nikola Vujčić (3×) (Maccabi Tel Aviv)

2007–08
 Meir Tapiro (3×) (Bnei HaSharon)
 P. J. Tucker (Hapoel Holon)
 Terence Morris (Maccabi Tel Aviv)
 Jamie Arnold (Hapoel Jerusalem)
 Otis Hill (Ironi Nahariya)

2008–09
 Doron Perkins (Maccabi Haifa)
 Luis Flores (Hapoel Holon)
 Omri Casspi (Maccabi Tel Aviv)
 Lior Eliyahu (3×) (Maccabi Tel Aviv)
 Omar Sneed (2×) (Hapoel Jerusalem)

2009–10
 Shmulik Brener (Barak Netanya)
 J. R. Pinnock (Barak Netanya)
 Guy Pnini (Maccabi Tel Aviv)
 Elishay Kadir (Hapoel Gilboa Galil)
 Brian Randle (Hapoel Gilboa Galil)

2010–11
 Moran Roth (Hapoel Holon)
 Jeremy Pargo (Maccabi Tel Aviv)
 Gal Mekel (Hapoel Gilboa Galil)
 Dwayne Mitchell (Maccabi Rishon Lezion)
 Lior Eliyahu (4×) (Maccabi Tel Aviv)

2011–12
 Moran Roth (2×) (Hapoel Holon)
 Derwin Kitchen (Maccabi Rishon LeZion)
 Josh Carter (Maccabi Ashdod)
 Lior Eliyahu (5×) (Maccabi Tel Aviv)
 Bryant Dunston (Hapoel Holon)

2012–13
 Gal Mekel (2×) (Maccabi Haifa)
 Scotty Hopson (Hapoel Eilat)
 Devin Smith (Maccabi Tel Aviv)
 Pat Calathes (Maccabi Haifa)
 Shawn James (Maccabi Tel Aviv)

2013–14
 Raviv Limonad (2×) (Hapoel Tel Aviv)
 Kevin Palmer (Hapoel Eilat)
 Donta Smith (Maccabi Haifa)
 Josh Duncan (Hapoel Jerusalem)
 Alex Tyus (Maccabi Tel Aviv)

2014–15
 Khalif Wyatt (Hapoel Eilat)
 Shawn Dawson (Maccabi Rishon LeZion)
 Devin Smith (2×) (Maccabi Tel Aviv)
 Lior Eliyahu (6×) (Hapoel Jerusalem)
 Ike Ofoegbu (Maccabi Haifa)

2015–16
 Gal Mekel (3×) (Maccabi Tel Aviv)
 Khalif Wyatt (2×) (Hapoel Eilat)
 Donta Smith (2×) (Hapoel Jerusalem)
 Lior Eliyahu (7×) (Hapoel Jerusalem)
 Darryl Monroe (Maccabi Rishon LeZion)

2016–17
 John DiBartolomeo (Maccabi Haifa)
 Curtis Jerrells (Hapoel Jerusalem)
 Andrew Goudelock (Maccabi Tel Aviv)
 James Bell (Hapoel Holon)
 Karam Mashour (Bnei Herzliya)

2017–18
 Jerome Dyson (Hapoel Jerusalem)
 Sek Henry (Maccabi Ashdod)
 Amit Simhon (Hapoel Eilat)
 Joe Alexander (Hapoel Holon)
 Zach LeDay (Hapoel Gilboa Galil)

2018–19
 John DiBartolomeo (2×) (Maccabi Tel Aviv)
 Corey Walden (Hapoel Holon)
 James Feldeine (Hapoel Jerusalem)
 Elijah Bryant (Hapoel Eilat)
 Tomer Ginat (Hapoel Tel Aviv)

2019–20
 Scottie Wilbekin (Maccabi Tel Aviv)
 J'Covan Brown (Hapoel Jerusalem)
 Alex Hamilton (Maccabi Rishon LeZion)
 Deni Avdija (Maccabi Tel Aviv)
 Tomer Ginat (2×) (Hapoel Tel Aviv)

2020–21
 Yiftach Ziv (Hapoel Gilboa Galil)
 Scottie Wilbekin (2×) (Maccabi Tel Aviv)
 Chris Johnson (Hapoel Holon)
 Casey Prather (Hapoel Eilat)
 Ante Žižić (Maccabi Tel Aviv)

2021–22
 Retin Obasohan (Hapoel Jerusalem)
 Chris Babb (Bnei Herzliya)
 Chris Johnson (2×) (Hapoel Holon)
 Nimrod Levi (Hapoel Galil Elyon)
 Chinanu Onuaku (Bnei Herzliya)

References

External links
Israeli League Official website
Eurobasket.com Israeli League Page